Government Model Senior Secondary School, Sector-16 (often called GMSSS-16 or simply 16-Model) is a State-funded co-educational secondary school located in Chandigarh, India, educating students in grades K–12. Founded in 1954, it is the oldest school in Chandigarh and among the most selective. The school is affiliated to the Central Board of Secondary Education and offers twenty-three subjects at the AISSCE level, among the highest for any school in the region. It also claims a 100% pass percentage at the All India Secondary School Certificate Examination level.

The school's main building was designed by Swiss architect Pierre Jeanneret, along with Bhanu Pratap Mathur and Jugal Kishore Chowdhary, in line with the former's modernist ideals and was inaugurated by the then Commissioner of the Union Territory of Chandigarh in 1954.

Academics

Curriculum 

The School is affiliated to the internationally-recognised Central Board of Secondary Education, New Delhi and follows the NCERT curriculum.

Subject areas 
The following subjects are offered at the AISSCE level:

Languages

 English Core (Mandatory)
 Hindi Core
 Hindi Elective
 Punjabi 
 Sanskrit Core
 French

Sciences

 Physics
 Chemistry
 Mathematics
 Biology
 Computer Science

Business and Commerce

 Business Studies
 Entrepreneurship
 Accountancy

Humanities and Social Sciences

 Economics
 Psychology
 Sociology
 History
 Political Science
 Philosophy
 Geography
 Legal Studies
 Fine Arts 
 Music (Vocal)
 Home Science

Non-credit

 Physical Education
 Work Experience
 General Studies

Notable alumni

Politics 

 Kapil Sibal, prominent lawyer and former Union Minister
 Ambika Soni, Member of Parliament and former Union Minister
 Chander Mohan, former deputy chief minister of Haryana
Deepak-Raj Gupta,  Member of the Australian Capital Territory Legislative Assembly, first PIO to get elected to Australian parliament

Academia 

 Manohar Lal Munjal, scientist and professor at the Indian Institute of Science
 Vijay K. Dhir, professor and former Dean of the Henry Samueli School of Engineering and Applied Science at UCLA
 Sunil Saigal, professor and former Dean of the Newark College of Engineering
 K. K. Aggarwal, professor and founding Vice Chancellor of the Guru Gobind Singh Indraprastha University.
 Paras Anand, Scientist and Group Leader at Imperial College London.

Arts 

D. S. Kapoor, art historian and former principal of Government College of Arts, Chandigarh

Armed Forces 

 Lt. Nishant Karol, Indian Army martyr. Every year the school hosts an intra-school quiz competition in his memory.

See also
Education in Punjab, India
List of institutions of higher education in Chandigarh
Chandigarh

References

External links

High schools and secondary schools in Chandigarh